Marc Brašnić (born 21 October 1996) is a professional footballer who plays as a forward for 1. FC Düren . Born in Germany, he has represented both Germany and Croatia at youth level.

Club career 
In 2015, Brašnić joined SC Paderborn 07 on loan from Bayer 04 Leverkusen. He made his 2. Bundesliga debut on 29 August 2015 against Arminia Bielefeld. He replaced Marcel Ndjeng after 85 minutes.

International career 
Brašnić was born in Germany and is of Croatian descent. He made two appearances for the Germany U15 squad, scoring one goal. He then switched federations and made an appearance for Croatia U19.

References

External links
 Marc Brašnić at kicker 
 German career stats - FuPa

1996 births
Living people
Sportspeople from Aachen
Footballers from North Rhine-Westphalia
German people of Croatian descent
Association football forwards
German footballers
Germany youth international footballers
Croatian footballers
Croatia youth international footballers
Bayer 04 Leverkusen players
SC Paderborn 07 players
SC Fortuna Köln players
FC Viktoria Köln players
Berliner FC Dynamo players
FC Rot-Weiß Erfurt players
Berliner AK 07 players
2. Bundesliga players
3. Liga players
Regionalliga players